John Atcherley Dew (born 5 May 1948) is a Roman Catholic bishop. He is the sixth Roman Catholic Archbishop of Wellington and the Metropolitan of New Zealand, serving since 2005. He was also created a cardinal by Pope Francis in 2015.

Background
Dew was born in Waipawa, the son of George and Joan Dew. He has two sisters. He attended St. Joseph's Primary School in Waipukurau (staffed by the Sisters of St Joseph of Nazareth) and St Joseph's College, Masterton (staffed by the Marist Brothers). He then went to the Marist Brothers Juniorate in Tuakau for a short time.

After about a year working at the Bank of New Zealand in Waipukurau, Anderson's Nurseries in Napier and studying horticulture, he commenced his studies for the priesthood at Holy Name Seminary, Christchurch, where he studied philosophy under Jesuit professors  for two years and then for five years he studied Theology at Holy Cross Seminary, Mosgiel, under the Vincentians. He played rugby union for the Holy Cross Seminary team in the position of prop.

Early ministry
Dew was ordained priest at Waipukurau by Cardinal Reginald Delargey in May 1976. He was appointed as an assistant priest in St Joseph's Parish, Upper Hutt, 1976–79. He served in the Cook Islands in the Diocese of Rarotonga from 1980 until 1982. He returned to Wellington. From 1983 to 1987 he had responsibility for the Archdiocesan Youth Ministry and the Cook Islands Māori Community.

Seminary director
Dew was on the staff of Holy Cross College, Mosgiel, the New Zealand national seminary, from 1988 to 1991. He was director of a special programme focussing on human development and gave a general introduction to first year students on prayer, scripture and the Church. He also led small groups of students ("moderator groups") who met regularly for prayer and discussion.

During his time at the seminary a major concern related to the selection of seminarians. In his 1991 First Year Moderators Report, Dew expressed a real sense of frustration at the unsuitability of many students. He pointed out that "we at the Seminary can work only with those who are sent to us." Many, he suggested, were sent with unresolved issues relating to identity, sexuality and alcohol. Such students placed a heavy burden on staff and had a negative impact upon other students and group dynamics. Dew urged that in the future, diocesan vocations directors pay particular attention to eight issues with evaluating prospective students: basic knowledge of the Catholic faith; familiarity with meditation, prayer and the scriptures; a reasonable comfort with affectivity; personal independence; social comfort; intellectual curiosity; generosity; and a genuine desire and free decision to enter the seminary.

Parish priest
Dew studied spirituality at the Institute of St Anselm, Kent, England, from 1991 to 1992. Upon his return to New Zealand he was appointed the parish priest at St Anne's Parish, Newtown, a post he held from 1993 to 1995.

Episcopal ministry
He was appointed as auxiliary bishop for the Wellington archdiocese on 31 May 1995 at the age of 47. The news of his appointment had been announced to a large congregation at the Chrism Mass on 12 April. "The news was greeted with prolonged and enthusiastic applause." Because Sacred Heart Cathedral would not have held the expected congregation, he was consecrated bishop in the Wellington Town Hall which was filled to capacity. He took as his motto Peace through Integrity.   He became the Secretary of the New Zealand Catholic Bishops' Conference and acted as New Zealand Bishops' Conference representative on the National Council for Young Catholics.

Archbishop of Wellington
Dew was appointed Coadjutor Archbishop of Wellington on 24 May 2004 by Pope John Paul II. He succeeded Thomas Stafford Williams as Archbishop of Wellington on 21 March 2005.

Dew attended the Synod of Bishops on "The Eucharist: Source and Summit of the Life and Mission of the Church" in October 2005 (see below). In 2012 he was appointed by Pope Benedict XVI to serve as a Synod father for the October 2012 Synod of Bishops on "The New Evangelization for the Transmission of the Christian Faith".

He was the "relator" for one of the large English-speaking groups in the 2014 Third Extraordinary General Assembly of the Synod of Bishops on the Pastoral Challenges of the Family in the Context of Evangelization, and he said he got to know Pope Francis "a little better" during that 2014 synod.

Dew is President of the New Zealand Catholic Bishops' Conference, Bishop of the Military Ordinariate of New Zealand, Bishops' conference Deputy for the National Committee for Professional Standards and for Finance, and Moderator of the Tribunal. In 2015 he completed a term as President of the Federation of Catholic Bishops' Conferences of Oceania (FCBCO) which comprises all the bishops of New Zealand, Australia, Papua New Guinea, the Solomons and the CEPAC bishops of the Pacific Islands.

Elevation to cardinal 
On 14 February 2015, Pope Francis made Dew a member of the College of Cardinals with the title of Cardinal-Priest of Sant’Ippolito John L. Allen Jr., in commenting on the appointment, described Dew as a "high profile moderate" in the Catholic Church. The appointment meant that New Zealand now had two cardinals at the same time, the other being Thomas Williams, although Williams had retired from active ministry in 2005, Cardinals routinely retain their titles for life. The other two cardinals from New Zealand were Reginald Delargey and Peter McKeefry.

On 13 April 2015, Dew was appointed a member of the Congregation for the Evangelization of Peoples and of the Pontifical Council for Promoting Christian Unity. He participated in the Fourteenth Ordinary General Assembly of the Synod of Bishops (4–25 October 2015) on "The vocation and mission of the family in the Church and in the contemporary world". On 28 October 2016, was appointed a member of the Congregation for Divine Worship and the Discipline of the Sacraments.

Approach

Kiwi bloke
Dew has recalled the announcement of his appointment as a cardinal in the early hours of the morning on 5 January 2015 and being woken to texts of congratulations on his cellphone. "Since then I have received nothing but love and support, messages of congratulation. By 7am, in my first radio interview for the day, I happened to say 'I am an ordinary Kiwi bloke.' Since then the words have been repeated back to me often, but I [still] believe this to be true."

Eucharist
Dew achieved some prominence at the Synod of Bishops on "The Eucharist: Source and Summit of the Life and Mission of the Church" at the Vatican in October 2005 when he proposed that divorced and remarried Catholics should be able to receive the Eucharist. He said that bishops have "a pastoral duty and an obligation before God to discuss and debate the question." He urged the assembly to reconsider the Church ban, referring to it as a "source of scandal", adding "Our Church would be enriched if we were able to invite dedicated Catholics, currently excluded from the Eucharist, to return to the Lord's Table." After this 2005 speech, Dew discussed the issue with Cardinal Jorge Mario Bergoglio, the future Pope Francis.

Acceptance
Dew has also said, "what's the point in judging people and condemning them, but to make it clear what the church says but in such a way that you are welcoming and accepting." "When church teaching is explained in such a way that it says to people they’re intrinsically disordered or they’re living an evil life, people feel they can’t meet the mark rather than it being something helping, supportive and encouraging."

Curia
In relation to Curia reform, Dew has said that he "would like to see ... local communities and diocesan bishops being able to dialogue with curial bishops in a way that truly reflects collegiality" and that the "Curia is to be at the service of the church and her people."

Climate and trafficking
In February 2015, Dew said he and Soane Patita Paini Mafi of Tonga, who was soon to become a cardinal alongside him, wanted to highlight two issues: the effect of climate change on the countries of the South Pacific and the problem of human trafficking in that part of the world.

Homosexuality
Cardinal Dew responded in 2018 to the Faith and Belief in New Zealand survey, which found only a third of the country identifies as Christian, down from 43 percent in 2013 and 49 percent in 2006. The main reason given for a failure to engage with Christianity was Church teachings on homosexuality – mentioned by 47 percent of the respondents – with the doctrine of Hell closely following, at 45 percent. Dew said Church leaders have fallen short, 
"especially with regards to particular groups in society, such as the LGBT community, who have felt a very real sense of rejection through the Church, or perhaps in falling short in fully meeting the needs of our recent migrant communities."

See also

 Catholic Church in New Zealand
 Roman Catholic Archdiocese of Wellington
 Sacred Heart Cathedral, Wellington
 Holy Name Seminary
 Holy Cross College, New Zealand
 Cardinals created by Francis

References

External links
 
 "Archbishop of Wellington: Most Reverend John Atcherley Dew DD", Catholic Archdiocese of Wellington (Retrieved 5 January 2015)
 Synodus Episcoporum Bulletin

1948 births
Living people
People from the Wellington Region
People from Waipawa
People from Waipukurau
Holy Name Seminary alumni
Holy Cross College, New Zealand alumni
New Zealand cardinals
Roman Catholic archbishops of Wellington
Cardinals created by Pope Francis
Members of the Congregation for the Evangelization of Peoples
Members of the Pontifical Council for Promoting Christian Unity
Members of the Congregation for Divine Worship and the Discipline of the Sacraments
20th-century Roman Catholic bishops in New Zealand
21st-century Roman Catholic archbishops in New Zealand
People educated at Chanel College, Masterton
New Zealand Roman Catholic archbishops